Balurghat Lok Sabha constituency is one of the 543 parliamentary constituencies in India. The constituency centres on Balurghat in West Bengal. While six of the assembly segments of No. 6 Balurghat Lok Sabha constituency are in Dakshin Dinajpur district one assembly segment is in Uttar Dinajpur district. The seat was earlier reserved for scheduled castes but from 2009 it is an open seat.

Assembly segments

As per order of the Delimitation Commission in respect of the delimitation of constituencies in the West Bengal, parliamentary constituency no. 6 Balurghat is composed of the following assembly segments from 2009:

Members of Parliament

Election results

General election 2019

General election 2014

General election 2009

General elections 1951-2004
Most of the contests were multi-cornered. However, only winners and runners-up are mentioned below:

Note: In 1951 and 1957 the contest was in the West Dinajpur constituency. From 1962, it was Balurghat constituency.

Notes

References

See also
 Balurghat
 List of Constituencies of the Lok Sabha

Lok Sabha constituencies in West Bengal
Politics of Dakshin Dinajpur district